Sant Salvador may refer to:

Sant Salvador de Breda, parish church and former Benedictine monastery in Breda
Sant Salvador de Guardiola, village in the comarca of Bages
Sant Salvador de la Vedella, Benedictine monastery in Catalonia

See also
San Salvador (disambiguation)